Narendra Achyut Dabholkar (1 November 1945 – 20 August 2013) was an Indian physician, social activist, rationalist and author from Maharashtra, India. In 1989 he founded and became president of the Maharashtra Andhashraddha Nirmoolan Samiti (MANS, Committee for Eradication of Superstition in Maharashtra). Triggered by his assassination on 20 August 2013, the pending Anti-Superstition and Black Magic Ordinance was promulgated in the state of Maharashtra, four days later. In 2014, he was posthumously awarded the Padma Shri for social work.

Personal life
Dabholkar was born on 1 November 1945 to Achyut and Tarabai, being the youngest of ten children. His elder siblings included the educationalist, and socialist Devdatta Dabholkar and Shripad Dabholkar. He is the uncle of Atish Dabholkar.

Narendra did his schooling at New English School Satara and Willingdon College, Sangli. He was a qualified medical doctor, having obtained an MBBS degree from the Government Medical College, Miraj.

He was the captain of the Shivaji University Kabaddi team. He had represented India against Bangladesh in a Kabaddi tournament. He won the Maharashtra government's Shiv Chhatrapati Yuva Award for Kabaddi.

He was married to Shaila, and has two children, Hamid and Mukta Dabholkar. His son was named after the social reformer Hamid Dalwai. He also criticised extravagant marriage ceremonies and arranged for his own children to be married in simple ceremonies. The almanac was not consulted to select an auspicious time as it is traditionally done. He was an atheist.

Activism 

After working as a doctor for 12 years, Dabholkar became a social worker in the 1980s. He became involved with movements for social justice, such as Baba Adhav's Ek Gaon Ek Panotha (One village – One well) initiative.

Gradually, Dabholkar started focusing on eradication of superstition, and joined the Akhil Bharatiya Andhashraddha Nirmoolan Samiti (ABANS). In 1989, he founded the Maharashtra Andhashraddha Nirmoolan Samiti (M.A.N.S), and campaigned against superstitions, confronting dubious tantriks and claimed holy men who promised 'miracle cures' for ailments. He criticised the country's "godmen", self-styled Hindu ascetics who claim to perform miracles and have many followers. He was the founding member of Parivartan, a social action centre located in Satara district, that seeks to "empower marginalised members of the community to lead lives of security, dignity, and prosperity". He was closely associated with the Indian rationalist Sanal Edamaruku. He was the editor of a renowned Marathi weekly Sadhana, which was founded by Sane Guruji. He also served earlier as a vice-president of the Federation of Indian Rationalist Associations.

Between 1990–2010, Dabholkar was active in a movements for the equality of Dalits (untouchables) and against India's caste system and caste-related violence. He advocated renaming the Marathwada University after Babasaheb Ambedkar, who is the author of India's constitution and fought for the equality of Dalits. Dabholkar wrote books on superstitions and their eradication, and had addressed over 3,000 public meetings. He had taken on Asaram Bapu in March 2013 over an incident during Holi in Nagpur, when Bapu and his followers used drinking water from tankers brought from the Nagpur Municipal Corporation to celebrate the festival. They were accused of wasting it while rest of Maharashtra faced drought.

Anti-superstition and black magic bill 

In 2010, Dabholkar made several failed attempts to get an anti-superstition law enacted in the state of Maharashtra. Under his supervision, MANS drafted the Anti-Jaadu Tona Bill (Anti-Superstition and Black Magic Ordinance). It was opposed by some political parties and the Warkari sect. Political parties like the Bharatiya Janata Party and the Shiv Sena opposed it claiming it would adversely affect Hindu culture, customs and traditions. Critics accused him of being anti-religion but in an interview with the Agence France-Presse news agency he said, "In the whole of the bill, there's not a single word about God or religion. Nothing like that. The Indian constitution allows freedom of worship and nobody can take that away, this is about fraudulent and exploitative practices."

A couple of weeks before his death on 6 August 2013, Dabholkar had complained in a press conference that the bill had not been discussed despite being tabled in seven sessions of the state assembly. He had criticised the Chief Minister of Maharashtra, Prithviraj Chavan, stating that the minister had disappointed the progressive people in the state. A day after Dabholkar's murder, the Maharashtra Cabinet cleared the Anti-Superstition and Black Magic Ordinance, however the parliament would still need to support the bill for it to become law.  After 29 amendments, it was finally enacted as an ordinance on 18 December 2013.

Assassination
Dabholkar had faced several threats and assaults since 1983 but had rejected police protection.

Murdered on 20 August 2013, while out on a morning walk, Dabholkar was shot down by two gunmen near Omkareshwar temple, Pune at 7:20 AM IST. The assailants fired four rounds at him from a point blank range and fled on a motorcycle parked nearby. Two bullets hit Dabholkar in his head and chest and he died on the spot.

Dabholkar had originally donated his body to a medical college. But, the autopsy made necessary by his murder left the slain leader's body unfit for academic purposes. He was cremated in Satara without any religious rites. His pyre was lit by his daughter, Mukta, in contradiction to the tradition where the son lights the pyre. His ashes were collected without any religious ceremony and scattered over his organic farm.

Reactions
Dabholkar's assassination was condemned by many political leaders and social activists. Furthermore, political parties called for a bandh (strike) in Pune on 21 August, and various institutions across Pune remained closed to protest Dabholkar's assassination.

Investigation

On 20 August 2013, the police stated that it is under suspicion that it was a planned murder because the assailants were aware Dabholkar stays in Pune only on Mondays and Tuesdays. Chavan stated on 26 August 2013 that the police have some clues about his murder. On 2 September, the police stated that 7 surveillance cameras had captured footage of the two assassins, and the footage had been sent to a London-based forensic lab for analysis.

A Public Interest Litigation (PIL) was filed by activist Ketan Tirodkar, urging the case to be investigated by the National Investigation Agency (NIA) instead of the state police, due to a lack of faith with the latter. The Bombay High Court sought responses from the NIA on 24 September. On 15 October, NIA said the case was well within the Indian Penal Code, adding that it was only the assumptions of the petitioner that right-wing activists were involved and it was a scheduled plan.

The Additional Sessions Judge S.R. Navandar (Special Judge for UAPA cases) was presented with a list of documents by the prosecution after charges had been framed in the 2013 murder case.

On 17 January 2014, during his visit to Pune, Home Minister R. R. Patil gave Pune police a week to make some progress or hand over the case to the Central Bureau of Investigation (CBI). On 20 January, Pune police arrested two suspects based on ballistic reports. The suspects had been previously accused of firearms dealing. Later on 4 March 2014, the Bombay High Court heard a modified PIL from Tirodkar, which sought to involve the CBI in the investigation. The court directed the Pune police to submit copies of case diaries. On 9 May 2014, the Bombay High Court transferred the case to the CBI.

In August 2015, the CBI and Maharashtra government announced a  reward for any person providing information regarding Narendra Dabholkar's assailants.

On 18 August 2018, the CBI arrested Sachin Prakasrao Andure, suspected of being one of the gunmen. Dabholkar's son Hamid Dabholkar believed this to be an important development in the case which will help identify the planner behind the assassination.

Legacy
In the aftermath of the assassination, the Anti-Superstition and Black Magic Ordinance, which Dabholkar helped draft, was enacted by the government of  Maharashtra in 2013. Since its passage, the law has been used to indict the perpetrators of a series of egregious lurid frauds, often combined with sexual assault. Unfortunately, the perpetrators have often eluded their victims and the police and escaped to other provinces in which no similar protection against charlatans yet exists.

The Anti-Superstition and Black Magic Ordinance applies only in the comparatively well-off and well-educated province of Maharashtra. In the rest of India the people lack comparable protection from fraudulent pretend-healers and other miracle fakers. Dalbholkar's daughter, Mukta, and other activists have picked up and carry forward his campaign for a national-wide anti-superstition law.

The All India Peoples Science Network (AIPSN) observes August 20 as National Scientific Temper day to commemorate Dr Narendra Dabholkar.

Books
Narendra Dabholkar has authored many books in Marathi which have been translated to Hindi and English.

 Ladhe Andhashraddheche
 Prashna Tumcha Uttar Dabholkaranche
 Timiratuni Tejakade
 The Case for Reason: Volume One: Understanding the Anti-superstition Movement
 The Case for Reason: Volume Two: A Scientific Enquiry into Belief
 Please Think

In popular culture
The assassination is featured along with assassinations of other rationalists such as Govind Pansare, M. M. Kalburgi and journalist Gauri Lankesh in the documentary mini-series Vivek-Reason by Anand Patwardhan.

Short film The Bookshelf  was produced in the memory of Narendra Dabholkar, Govind Pansare and M. M. Kalburgi by three Indian publishing houses Tulika Books, Perumal Murugan's publisher Kalachuvadu and Deshabhimani Book House.

See also
 Superstition in India
 Anti-Superstition and Black Magic Ordinance 
 Govind Pansare
 M. M. Kalburgi
 Maharashtra Andhashraddha Nirmoolan Samiti (MANS; or Committee for Eradication of Blind Faith, CEBF), founded by Narendra Dabholkar
 Sebastian Martin

References

External links
 Maharashtra Andhashraddha Nirmoolan Samiti (antisuperstition.org), founded by Narendra Dabholkar

1945 births
2013 deaths
Indian atheism activists
Assassinated Indian people
Deaths by firearm in India
Indian kabaddi players
20th-century Indian medical doctors
Indian rationalists
Indian religious sceptics
Indian sceptics
People from Satara (city)
People murdered in Maharashtra
Persecution of atheists
Shivaji University alumni
Kabaddi players from Pune
Recipients of the Padma Shri in social work
Social workers
Scientists from Pune
20th-century atheists
21st-century atheists
Medical doctors from Maharashtra
Social workers from Maharashtra